Mahmoud Hassan (born 19 November 1943) is an Egyptian former footballer who played as a midfielder.

Career
Hassan was included in Egypt's squad (then called the United Arab Republic) for the football tournament at the 1964 Summer Olympics in Tokyo, Japan. He made his debut for the team on 12 October 1964 in a 1–1 draw with Brazil during the group stage. On 16 October, he scored his first goal for the team, getting the final goal in the 10–0 win over South Korea. The team managed to reach the semi-finals of the competition before losing to eventual gold medalists Hungary. The team finished fourth after losing to the United Team of Germany in the bronze medal match, the best ever finish for Egypt at the Olympic football tournament (along with 1928).

References

External links
 Olympic profile
 

1943 births
Living people
Egyptian footballers
Olympic footballers of Egypt
Footballers at the 1964 Summer Olympics
1963 African Cup of Nations players
Association football midfielders
Tersana SC players